Talitay, officially the Municipality of Talitay (Maguindanaon: Ingud nu Talitay; Iranun: Inged a Talitay), is a  municipality in the province of Maguindanao del Norte, Philippines. According to the 2020 census, it has a population of 17,463 people.

History
On July 1, 1996, during the fourth regular session of the second regional assembly of the Autonomous Region in Muslim Mindanao, the regional legislature created the municipality of Talitay under Muslim Mindanao Autonomy Act No. 52 which was approved in a plebescite on August 30, 1996. The town was carved out of the municipality of Talayan. The ARMM law creating the municipality provides that its administrative center shall be established in barangay Talitay.

On April 15, 2008, during the third regular session of the fifth assembly of the regional legislature, it was then renamed into Sultan Sumagka through the enactment of Muslim Mindanao Autonomy Act No. 228. However no record of a plebiscite was held to affirm the renaming.

On March 22, 2021, the town was placed under a state of calamity due to family feud (rido) between the former mayor Montasir Sabal and Watamama-Amiril families, belonging to the MILF.  The former mayor offered his resignation as a result of prolonged fight between the two sides. Currently, the Maguindanao provincial government installed a care-taker for the municipality, resulting in a controversy with the MILG, considering that by law of succession of the Local Government Code, Moner Sabal should be the successor.

On June 17, 2021, the former mayor Montasir Sabal was killed while under police custody after his arrest on Port of Batangas.

When Maguindanao province was divided into Maguindanao del Sur and Maguindanao del Norte after the September 2022 division plebiscite, Talitay became part of the latter province.

Geography

Barangays

Talitay is politically subdivided into 9 barangays.

Bintan (Bentan)
Gadungan
Kiladap
Kilalan
Kuden
Makadayon
Manggay
Pageda
Talitay Proper

Climate

Demographics

Economy

References

External links
MMA Act No. 52 : An Act creating the Municipality of Talitay in the Province of Maguindanao
MMA Act No. 228 : An Act changing the Name of Municipality of Talitay in the Province of Maguindanao to Municipality of Talitay
 Sultan Sumagka Profile at the DTI Cities and Municipalities Competitive Index
 [ Philippine Standard Geographic Code]
2000 Philippine Census Information
Local Governance Performance Management System

Municipalities of Maguindanao del Norte